Lilian Bwalya (born 28 December 1974) is a Zambian sprinter. She competed in the women's 400 metres at the 2000 Summer Olympics.

References

External links
 

1974 births
Living people
Athletes (track and field) at the 2000 Summer Olympics
Zambian female sprinters
Olympic athletes of Zambia
Place of birth missing (living people)
Olympic female sprinters